Enrico David (born 1966, Ancona, Italy) is an artist based in London. He works in painting, drawing, sculpture and installation, at times employing traditional craft techniques. In the 1990s he garnered acclaim for creating monumental embroidered portraits using sewn canvases, which often began as drawings and collages from fashion magazines.  During the past several years David focused on sculpture in a variety of media and returned to more traditional methods of painting. His recent works include large-scale portraits of deeply psychological meaning. Drawing continues to be an important element of his practice.

David studied at Central St. Martins in London and has since exhibited his work in galleries and museums worldwide. David was shortlisted for the Turner Prize in 2009. In 2012 he mounted his first solo exhibition in New York City, Head Gas, organized by the New Museum. In 2013 David presented a major installation of paintings, tapestries and sculptures as part of The Encyclopedic Palace, curated by Massimiliano Gioni for the Venice Biennale.

An installation, Spring Session Men, was included in the group exhibition Secret Societies, organized in 2011 by Schirn Kunsthalle Frankfurt and CAPC Bordeaux. Museum of Contemporary Art Chicago, Chicago (2018).

In 2019, the largest U.S. museum survey of David's work to date occurred between the Museum of Contemporary Art Chicago and the Hirshhorn Museum and Sculpture Garden. Curated by Michael Darling, chief curator of MCA Chicago, Enrico David: Gradations of Slow Release featured twenty years of David's artistic output.

References

External links
New Museum,
Dan Fox reviews Enrico David's exhibition at ICA London, Frieze Magazine Online, 2007 
Feature article in Sculpture magazine, 2019

Italian contemporary artists
21st-century Italian sculptors
Italian male sculptors
Italian installation artists
1966 births
Living people
21st-century Italian male artists